Luca Maniero (born 12 June 1995) is an Italian professional footballer who plays for Cittadella as a goalkeeper.

References

1995 births
Sportspeople from Padua
Living people
Italian footballers
Calcio Padova players
Inter Milan players
Pordenone Calcio players
F.C. Crotone players
Mantova 1911 players
Palermo F.C. players
A.S. Cittadella players
Serie C players
Association football goalkeepers
Footballers from Veneto